Robert Moore Peile (c.1760s - 4 February 1858) was the president of the Royal College of Surgeons in Ireland (RCSI) in 1798 and 1816.

In 1809, Peile graduated M.D. of St. Andrew's University. In 1790 he was appointed as Surgeon to the House of Industry Hospitals, and continued in office for more than half a century. He was Consulting Surgeon to Steevens' Hospital. In 1795 he was appointed Surgeon to the Hospitals for the Forces serving in Ireland, in 1803 he was promoted to be Deputy-Inspector of same, and in 1847 lie retired with the rank of Inspector-General. Peile was noted as the inventor of a lithotome, which definitely limited and rendered more facile the incision. According to Cameron, at one time " Peile's lithotome and staff" were to be found in every surgery; and although they are no longer employed, their principles are preserved in the newer forms of the instrument. Robert Smith stated that out of forty operations for stone, which he knew to have been performed by Peile, only one case had a fatal result.

References 

Presidents of the Royal College of Surgeons in Ireland
Irish surgeons
1760s births
1858 deaths
Year of birth uncertain